VAU or Vau can mean:
V Australia, an Australian airline company, part of the Virgin conglomerate
Vau, Óbidos, a village in Óbidos, Portugal municipality
waw (letter), a letter in several Semitic alphabets
digamma, an obsolete letter in the Greek alphabet
Vau, Algarve, a village in Algarve, Portugal